The  is the name of a hotel chain company headquartered in Toshima-ku, Tokyo, Japan. It is a subsidiary of Seibu Holdings, Inc. Together with Seibu Railway, Prince Hotels is the core company of Seibu Group.

Overview
During the Allied occupation of Japan following World War II, many members of the Japanese peerage lost their titles and were subject to crippling taxation on their real estate holdings. Yasujirō Tsutsumi, who controlled the Seibu Railway through the Kokudo Corporation, arranged to buy several of these families' properties at a discount and used them to develop hotels. The first of these hotels, the Grand Prince Hotel Takanawa, opened in 1953 on the site of the Takeda-no-miya residence. The Tokyo Prince Hotel opened in 1964 on a site that originally housed graves of several Tokugawa family shoguns, whose bodies were moved to the neighboring temple of Zojo-ji.

Originally, hotels branded as Prince Hotels were not wholly owned by Prince Hotels Company, but were instead operated by different companies, such as Seibu Railway, Kokudo, or Izuhakone Railway. The management system of Prince Hotels was described as "debt operation" by the media. It borrowed funds from banks, developed land using the funds, and borrowed more funds with the growth of land values. The system worked in the 1960s with Japanese economic growth, until the 1990s when the bubble economy burst.

Under the reorganization of the Seibu Group following the de-listing of Seibu Railway in 2005, Prince Hotels Company merged with Kokudo. All the Prince Hotels are now operated by Prince Hotels Company. Because of the unreasonable expansion in the past, the company has many underperforming facilities. Under the current plan of turnaround, it closed, sold, and plans to close or sell roughly 40 facilities.

Reorganization
Tsutsumi registered Seibu Railway shares owned by Kokudo in the names of various affiliated individuals, often without their permission, so that the true ownership of the company was not readily apparent. Following the death of Tsutsumi in 1964, his third son Yoshiaki Tsutsumi inherited control of Kokudo and continued the practice of falsifying shareholder records. His holdings in Kokudo and Seibu led to his being deemed the "world's richest man" by Forbes magazine for four consecutive years from 1987 to 1990, with estimated net worth of $15–20 billion during the height of the Japanese asset bubble. He was arrested on securities fraud charges in March 2005.

On December 21, 2005, Seibu Railway was delisted from the Tokyo Stock Exchange. A reorganization of the group, completed in February 2006, created Seibu Holdings to act as a holding company for both the railway and Prince Hotels. Cerberus Capital Management, an American investment fund, became the largest shareholder in Seibu Holdings with a 29.9% share of the new company.

In late 2012 and early 2013, Cerberus proposed that Seibu Railway abolish five non-core lines, along with other restructuring measures throughout the Seibu Holdings group, but management refused to implement these changes. Cerberus then executed a tender offer to increase its stake to 35% as of June 2013, giving Cerberus the power to veto shareholder resolutions. Cerberus had aimed to raise its stake to 44%, bringing it closer to an outright majority, but Seibu management engaged in a massive campaign to thwart the tender offer, including advertising within Seibu trains to passengers who owned stock. The East Japan Railway Company and several financial institutions also planned a support scheme to keep Cerberus from acquiring control of Seibu, but it was ultimately not implemented due to a lack of potential financial benefit for the investors. At the June 2013 shareholder meeting, several proposals by Cerberus were voted down, including the election of outside directors and the abolition of non-core lines.

, Yoshiaki Tsutsumi remains a major investor in Seibu Holdings through his 36% investment in NW Corporation, the second-largest shareholder in the company with a share of around 15%. Tsutsumi refused to respond to the Cerberus tender offer at the urging of Seibu management.

Hotels

The following list uses the English translations of the hotel names.

The Prince Gallery 
 The Prince Gallery Tokyo Kioicho (affiliated with Marriott International under The Luxury Collection brand)

The Prince
The Prince is the brand name for the most luxurious hotels by the company.
The Prince Hakone: Hakone, Kanagawa
The Prince Karuizawa: Karuizawa, Nagano
The Prince Kyoto Takaragaike: Sakyō-ku, Kyoto (affiliated with Marriott International under Autograph Collection brand)
The Prince Park Tower Tokyo: Minato, Tokyo
The Prince Sakura Tower Tokyo: Minato, Tokyo (affiliated with Marriott International under Autograph Collection brand)
The Prince Villa Karuizawa: Karuizawa, Nagano

Grand Prince Hotels
Grand Prince Hotels is the brand name for city hotels.
Grand Prince Hotel Hiroshima: Minami-ku, Hiroshima
Grand Prince Hotel New Takanawa: Minato, Tokyo
Grand Prince Hotel Takanawa: Minato, Tokyo

Prince Hotels (Japan)
Furano Prince Hotel: Furano, Hokkaidō
Hakodate Ōnuma Prince Hotel: Nanae, Hokkaidō
Kamakura Prince Hotel: Kamakura, Kanagawa
Karuizawa Asama Prince Hotel: Karuizawa, Nagano
Karuizawa Prince Hotel East: Karuizawa, Nagano
Karuizawa Prince Hotel West: Karuizawa, Nagano
Kawagoe Prince Hotel: Kawagoe, Saitama
Kushiro Prince Hotel: Kushiro, Hokkaidō
Kussharo Prince Hotel: Teshikaga, Hokkaidō
Manza Prince Hotel: Tsumagoi, Gunma
Naeba Prince Hotel: Yuzawa, Niigata
New Furano Prince Hotel: Furano, Hokkaidō
Nichinan Kaigan Nangō Prince Hotel: Nangō, Miyazaki
Ōiso Prince Hotel: Ōiso, Kanagawa
Ōtsu Prince Hotel: Ōtsu, Shiga
Sapporo Prince Hotel: Chūō-ku, Sapporo, Hokkaidō.
Shiga Kōgen Prince Hotel: Yamanouchi, Nagano
Shimoda Prince Hotel: Shimoda, Shizuoka
Shin Yokohama Prince Hotel: Kōhoku-ku, Yokohama
Shinagawa Prince Hotel: Minato, Tokyo
Shinjuku Prince Hotel: Shinjuku, Tokyo
Shizukuishi Prince Hotel: Shizukuishi, Iwate
Sunshine City Prince Hotel: Toshima, Tokyo
Towada Prince Hotel: Kosaka, Akita
Tsumagoi Prince Hotel: Tsumagoi, Gunma
Tōkyō Prince Hotel: Minato, Tokyo

Others
Ashinokohan Takagowa Onsen Fuyō-Tei (ryokan): Hakone, Kanagawa
Ashinokohan Takagowa Onsen Ryūgūden (ryokan): Hakone, Kanagawa
Chigataki Prince Hotel: Non-public, Emperor's villa.
Hakone En Cottage West: Hakone, Kanagawa
Hakone En Cottage Camping: Hakone, Kanagawa
Hakone Yunohana Onsen Hotel: Hakone, Kanagawa
Hotel Daihakone: Hakone, Kanagawa
Hotel Sea Paradise Inn: Kanazawa-ku, Yokohama
Izu Nagaoka Onsen Sanyō-Sō (ryokan): Izunokuni, Shizuoka
Kawana Hotel: Itō, Shizuoka
Ryūgūden (ryokan): Hakone, Kanagawa
The Hotel Seiryu Kyoto Kiyomizu: Higashiyama-ku, Kyoto

Overseas
Prince Resorts Hawaii: 
Prince Waikiki (Hawaii Prince Hotel Waikiki): Honolulu, Hawaii
Hawaii Prince Golf Club
Hapuna Beach Prince Hotel: Kohala Coast, Hawaii (now The Westin Hapuna Beach Resort as part of an agreement with Marriott)
Hapuna Golf Course
Mauna Kea Beach Hotel: Kohala Coast, Hawaii (affiliated with Marriott International under the Autograph Collection brand)
Mauna Kea Golf Course
Gloria Prince Hotel: Taipei, Taiwan
Nice Prince Hotel: Chiayi, Taiwan

StayWell Holdings
 The Prince Akatoki London
 Park Regis
 Leisure Inn

Previous Hotel Properties
 Alyeska Prince Hotel, Girdwood, Alaska (now Alyeska Resort)
 Grand Prince Hotel Akasaka: Chiyoda, Tokyo (closed March 31, 2011)
 Maui Prince Hotel, Wailea-Makena, Hawaii (now Makena Beach and Golf Resort )
 Toronto Prince Hotel, Toronto, Ontario (now a Westin property)
Prince Hotel & Residence Kuala Lumpur: Kuala Lumpur, Malaysia (now Pullman Kuala Lumpur City Centre Hotel & Residence)
 Kitakyushu Prince Hotel: Yahatanishi-ku, Kitakyūshū (closed February 25, 2007, now Crown Palais Kitakyushu)
 Aso Prince Hotel: Aso, Kumamoto Prefecture

Ski areas and aerial lifts

Chairlifts are excluded.
Furano Ski Resort : Furano, Hokkaidō
Furano Ropeway
Kitanomine Gondola
Shizukuishi Ski Resort: Shizukuishi, Iwate
Shizukuishi Gondola
Ropeway
Karuizawa Prince Hotel Ski Resort: Karuizawa, Nagano
Manza Onsen Ski Resort: Tsumagoi, Gunma
Mt. Naeba Snow Resort: Yuzawa, Niigata
 Naeba Ski Resort
Prince First Gondola
Prince Second Gondola
Naeba Tashiro Gondola (Dragondola)
Kagura Ski Resort (Kagura Area, Mitsumata Gelände, and Tashiro Area): Yuzawa, Niigata
Kagura Gondola
Mitsumata Ropeway
Tashiro Ropeway
Muikamachi Hakkaisan Ski Resort: Minamiuonuma, Niigata
Hakkaisan Ropeway
Myōkō Suginohara Ski Resort: Myōkō, Niigata
Myōkō Suginohara Gondola
Sayama Ski Resort: Tokorozawa, Saitama
Shiga Kōgen Yakebitaiyama Ski Resort: Yamanouchi, Nagano
Yakebitaiyama First Gondola
Yakebitaiyama Second Gondola

Toll roads
Manza Highway: Tsumagoi, Gunma
Onioshi Highway: Karuizawa, Nagano–Tsumagoi, Gunma

See also
Seibu Railway
Saitama Seibu Lions
Yokohama Hakkeijima Sea Paradise

References

External links

  
  

 
Companies based in Saitama Prefecture
Hospitality companies of Japan
Japanese brands
Hotel chains in Japan
Japanese companies established in 1956